Indian Land is an unincorporated community in the northernmost part (the "Panhandle") of Lancaster County, South Carolina, United States. It lies 6-miles east of Fort Mill, and west of the villages of Marvin and Waxhaw in North Carolina.

Indian Land is located 20 miles south of the South Carolina and North Carolina State Border. While not incorporated, the community is assigned with the ZIP code 29707. U.S. Highway 521 is a major highway that runs through the community and connects Indian Land with cities in North Carolina, and Lancaster County to the south.

Education

Schools in Indian Land include Indian Land Elementary, Harrisburg Elementary, Van Wyck Elementary, Indian Land Intermediate School, Indian Land Middle School, and Indian Land High School. In 2006, Indian Land High School earned state recognition for being a Red Carpet School.  Indian Land Middle School has been recognized as a National School to Watch, a State School of Character, a Palmetto Gold School, and a Red Carpet School. Harrisburg Elementary School was recognized as a National School of Character for 2017. Van Wyck Elementary School opened in August 2018 to serve the southern end of Indian Land and the Town of Van Wyck.

Indian Land has a public library, a branch of the Lancaster County Library.

In August 2018, the University of South Carolina Lancaster began offering courses in Indian Land, SC in the Indian Land High School building.

In August 2021, the New Indian Land High School opened. With the new school open the previse high school was changed to Indian Land Middle School with grades 7-8th and Indian Land Intermediate School (formally Indian Land Middle School) now grades 5-6th.

Transportation
U.S. Route 521 and South Carolina Highway 160 are two major roads that run through Indian Land. U.S. Route 521, the main road that Indian Land runs through, is lined with retail, businesses and restaurants. Indian Land is part of the Charlotte–Concord–Gastonia, NC-SC Metropolitan Statistical Area.

Highway Corridor Overlay District
The third and final reading of the Panhandle's Highway Corridor Overlay District was approved on June 9, 2014, which applies to properties along Charlotte Highway (U.S. 521) from Waxhaw Highway (S.C. 75) north to the state line and Fort Mill Highway (S.C. 160) east to the county line. The overlay district sets aesthetic requirements on new construction along the corridors covering everything from building materials, placement and setbacks to signage, sidewalks and landscaping.

Incorporation
An unsuccessful vote to incorporate took place on March 27, 2018. Results were 83% against incorporation with a 42% voter turnout.

Notable people
 Shawn Crawford (born 1978), sprinter
 Mick Mulvaney (born 1967), former acting White House Chief of Staff and 41st Director of the Office of Management and Budget (OMB)

References

Unincorporated communities in Lancaster County, South Carolina
Unincorporated communities in South Carolina